Conspiracy of the Pintos, also known as the Pinto Revolt or the Pinto Conspiracy, and in Portuguese as A Conjuração dos Pintos, was a rebellion against Portuguese rule in Goa in 1787.  The leaders of the plot were three prominent priests from the village of Candolim in the concelho of Bardez, Goa. They belonged to the Pinto clan, hence the name of the rebellion.

Principal characters
 Fr. Caetano Vitorino de Faria, the mastermind
  Fr. José Custódio de Faria, also known as Abbé Faria, his son who was also a priest
 Fr. Caetano Francisco do Couto
 Fr. José António Gonçalves, a priest from Divar
 Ignacio Pinto, head of the Pinto clan and a fervent supporter of Fr. Faria
 José da Rocha Dantas e Mendonça, a Judge of the Goa High Court, who was in charge of the inquest into the conspiracy

Causes 
P. Kamat writes that the protests of the various priests she studied for their non-submission to the Portuguese authority in Goa were by and large manifestations of their immediate personal grievances arising out of racial discrimination and administrative abuses.

José António and Caetano visited Rome and Portugal to plead for their appointment as Bishops in Southern India dioceses, but these Goan priests were bypassed in favour of the local South Indian St. Thomas clerics (e.g. Bishop Joseph Kariattil) for the appointment to the vacant sees of Cranganore and Mylapore. As a result of this refusal, they hatched the conspiracy along with Abbé Faria.  They also managed to obtain the sympathy of similarly disaffected Christians in the Army and local clergy.

The conspirators also negotiated secretly with Tippu Sultan, the ruler of Mysore, inviting him to invade and conquer Goa after they had thrown Goa into disorder.

The conspiracy was revealed by a Goan Catholic baker from Salcette to the authorities (the conspirators had approached him to poison the Army's bread supplies), thereby preventing invasion from the Muslim sultanate and similar ill-treatment of Goan Catholics as what was taking place during the Captivity of Mangalorean Catholics at Seringapatam.

Aftermath 
The conspiracy being made known to the authorities, they took vigorous steps to pre-empt it. Some of the conspirators fled in disguise to British territory. However, the authorities arrested and punished 47 persons, including 17 priests and seven army officers.

The area around the present day GPO (General Post Office) in Panjim is called São Tomé. The present GPO building used to be the old tobacco house, and the building to its right was the Government Mint. The area in front of these buildings was the old Panjim pillory and used to be the site of public executions, and was where fifteen conspirators of the failed revolt were executed.

Gonçalves fled to British territory and lived the remainder of his life as an English teacher in Calcutta. Abbé Faria teamed up with the French Revolutionaries and participated along with the "juring" clerics in the Revolutionaries' brutal persecution of the Catholic Church in France and elsewhere.

For decades after, the Conspiracy was used as a stick to defame and denigrate Goan missionaries and priests in British India by their opponents, the Vicars Apostolic of the Propaganda party, Goans being of the Padroado party. The incident was used to represent the Goans to the British government and to the Christians in British India as untrustworthy, rebellious and willing to compromise with their own enemies (Tipu Sultan). This became Goa's Black Legend.

References
 da Cunha Rivara, Joaquim Heliodoró. Goa and the Revolt of 1787, New Delhi: Concept Publ. Company, 292 pgs., 1996. (Author was the Portuguese Chief Secretary of the Goa Government from 1855 to 1877)
 Borges, C. J. Goa and the Revolt of 1787, 1996, 290 pgs. $22 
 Kamat, P. Some Protesting Priests of Goa, in T.R. de Souza (ed.), Essays in Goan History, New Delhi, Concept Publication Co., 1989 : 103-117.
 https://web.archive.org/web/20061214092018/http://www.goacom.com/culture/history/pinto.html
 http://www.goacom.com/the-pinto-rebellion

Conflicts in 1787
Colonial Goa
1787 in Portuguese India
Rebellions in India
Conspiracies
1787 in India
1780s in Portuguese India
1780s in the Portuguese Empire